Alfred Bradley Fitt (April 12, 1923 – July 7, 1992) was an American attorney who served as General Counsel of the Army from 1964 to 1967, as Assistant Secretary of Defense for Manpower and Reserve Affairs from 1967 to 1969, as general counsel of the Congressional Budget Office from 1975 to 1992.

Early life and education
Alfred B. Fitt was born in Highland Park, Illinois, on April 12, 1923. He was educated at Yale University, receiving a B.A. in 1946. He then attended the University of Michigan Law School, received a LLB in 1948. He was admitted to the bar in 1948.

Career 
In 1948, Fitt became an associate at the Detroit law firm of Lewis & Watkins. He became a partner in the firm in 1952. In 1954, he left Lewis & Watkins to become a legal adviser to the governor of Michigan, G. Mennen Williams. In 1960, he moved to Washington, D.C., to become associate counsel of the United States Senate Judiciary Subcommittee on Administrative Oversight and the Courts. In 1961, he became chief counsel of the Special Committee on FAA Procedures.

Later in 1961, Fitt joined the United States Department of the Army as Deputy Under Secretary of the Army for Manpower. He served as Deputy Assistant Secretary of Defense for Civil Rights as 1963 to 1964. From 1964 to 1967, he served as General Counsel of the Army. He was Assistant Secretary of Defense for Manpower and Reserve Affairs from October 9, 1967, to February 20, 1969.

Fitt was heavily involved in the execution of the manpower programs Project 100,000 and Project Transition in the Johnson administration. Fitt continued to communicate with former Secretary of Defense Robert McNamara on the progress of these programs given McNamara's personal devotion to them. 

Fitt left government service in 1969 to become President of Yale Kingman Brewster Jr.'s special assistant for community and alumni affairs.

In 1975, Fitt left Yale to become general counsel of the Congressional Budget Office, a position he would hold for the next seventeen years.

Personal life 
Fitt was married twice. His second wife, Lois Dickson Rice (1933–2017), married Fitt in 1977, four years after her divorce from Emmett J. Rice, making Fitt the stepfather of Susan Rice. Fitt died on July 7, 1992, at the age of 69.

Works

"The National Guard and Civil Disturbance", City (August/September 1970), pp. 41–43.
"The Buckley Amendment: Understanding It, Living with It", The College Board Review, No. 96, Summer 1975, 2 & 3
Social Security Benefits for Students (1977).
"In Search of a Just Outcome", Change, Vol. 9, No. 10 (Oct., 1977), pp. 22–25, 59.

References

1923 births
1992 deaths
People from Highland Park, Illinois
General Counsels of the United States Army
Michigan lawyers
Yale University alumni
University of Michigan Law School alumni
Writers from Illinois
Writers from Michigan
20th-century American lawyers
United States Assistant Secretaries of Defense